The 15th CARIFTA Games was held in Les Abymes, Guadeloupe on March 29–31, 1986.

Participation (unofficial)

For the 1986 CARIFTA Games only the medalists can be found on the "World Junior Athletics History" website.  An unofficial count yields the number of about 111 medalists (64 junior (under-20) and 47 youth (under-17)) from about 14 countries:  Antigua and Barbuda (1), Bahamas (26), Barbados (11), Bermuda (5), Cayman Islands (2), French Guiana (1), Grenada (2), Guadeloupe (11), Jamaica (32), Martinique (7), Saint Kitts and Nevis (2), Saint Lucia (2), Suriname (1),  Trinidad and Tobago (8).

Austin Sealy Award

The Austin Sealy Trophy for the most outstanding athlete of the games was awarded to Pascal Théophile from Guadeloupe.  He won 2 gold medals (100m, and 200m) in the youth (U-17) category.

Medal summary
Medal winners are published by category: Boys under 20 (Junior), Girls under 20 (Junior), Boys under 17 (Youth), and Girls under 17 (Youth).
The medalists can also be found on the "World Junior Athletics History" website.

Boys under 20 (Junior)

Girls under 20 (Junior)

Boys under 17 (Youth)

Girls under 17 (Youth)

Medal table (unofficial)

References

External links
World Junior Athletics History

CARIFTA Games
International sports competitions hosted by Guadeloupe
1986 in Guadeloupe
CARIFTA
1986 in Caribbean sport
Athletics competitions in Guadeloupe